The Four-man bobsleigh competition at the 1976 Winter Olympics in Innsbruck was held on 15 and 16 February, at Olympic Sliding Centre Innsbruck.

Results

References

Bobsleigh at the 1976 Winter Olympics